Musharwa Halt railway station is a halt railway station on Muzaffarpur–Gorakhpur main line under the Samastipur railway division of East Central Railway zone. This is situated beside Bettiah-Narkatiaganj Road at Musharwa in West Champaran district of the Indian state of Bihar.

References

Railway stations in West Champaran district
Samastipur railway division